Joshua Hernandez is an American politician and businessman serving as a member of the New Mexico House of Representatives from the 60th district. Elected in 2020, he assumed office on January 19, 2021.

Early life and education 
Hernandez was born in Albuquerque, New Mexico and graduated from Cibola High School. He studied marketing at the University of New Mexico, but did not graduate. In 2022, he will earn an associate degree in digital marketing from Central New Mexico Community College.

Career 
After leaving the University of New Mexico, Hernandez worked for AT&T, Apple, and Lobo Internet Services. In 2011 and 2012, he served as the director of information technology on Janice Arnold-Jones's unsuccessful campaign for New Mexico's 1st congressional district. He was the campaign manager for  all of Gregg Hull's successful campaigns for Rio Rancho mayor. Hernandez has since worked as the digital marketing manager for Agenda LLC, a PR firm, as the general manager of a pizza restaurant in Albuquerque and as the general manager for Club Rio Rancho. Hernandez also ran unsuccessfully for Rio Rancho City Council in 2016.

In 2020, Hernandez ran unopposed for the 60th district in the New Mexico House of Representatives. He assumed office on January 19, 2021, succeeding incumbent Republican Tim Lewis.

Personal life 
Hernandez lives in Rio Rancho, New Mexico.

References 

Living people
Politicians from Albuquerque, New Mexico
People from Rio Rancho, New Mexico
Republican Party members of the New Mexico House of Representatives
Businesspeople from New Mexico
Year of birth missing (living people)
Hispanic and Latino American state legislators in New Mexico